Jordan Jackson (born January 30, 1998) is an American football defensive end for the Denver Broncos of the National Football League (NFL). He played college football at Air Force and was drafted by the Saints in the sixth round of the 2022 NFL Draft.

College career
Jackson was ranked as a twostar recruit by 247Sports.com coming out of high school. He committed to Air Force and enrolled in the United States Air Force Academy before the 2017 season.

Professional career

New Orleans Saints
Jackson was drafted by the New Orleans Saints with the 194th pick in the sixth round of the 2022 NFL Draft. He was waived on August 30, 2022 and signed to the practice squad the next day.

Denver Broncos
On January 10, 2023, Jackson signed a futures contract with the Denver Broncos.

References

External links
 New Orleans Saints bio
 Air Force Falcons bio

1998 births
Living people
Players of American football from Jacksonville, Florida
American football defensive ends
American football defensive tackles
Air Force Falcons football players
New Orleans Saints players
Denver Broncos players